Wiktor Przyjemski (born 23 May 2005) is an international speedway rider from Poland.

Speedway career 
Przyjemski came to prominence in 2022, when he was part of the Polish team that won the World U23 Championship.

During 2021 and 2022, he rode for Bydgoszcz in the Ekstraliga and in 2022 for Kolejarz Rawicz in the Polish Speedway Second League. In 2023, he will ride for Rospiggarna in the Elitserien.

References 

Living people
2005 births
Polish speedway riders